Roy Edward Carlyle (December 10, 1900 – November 22, 1956) was an outfielder in Major League Baseball who played between  and  for the Washington Senators (1925), Boston Red Sox (1925–26) and New York Yankees (1926). Carlyle batted left-handed and threw right-handed. He was born in Buford, Georgia.

In a two-season career, Carlyle was a .312 hitter (157-for-504) with nine home runs and 76 RBI in 174 games, including 61 runs, 31 doubles, six triples, and one stolen base. He hit for the cycle on July 21, 1925, while with the Red Sox.

Roy's younger brother, Cleo Carlyle, was also an outfielder.

Carlyle died in Norcross, Georgia, at the age of 55.


See also
 List of Major League Baseball players to hit for the cycle

References

Further reading

External links
, or Retrosheet

1900 births
1956 deaths
Boston Red Sox players
New York Yankees players
Washington Senators (1901–1960) players
Major League Baseball outfielders
Baseball players from Georgia (U.S. state)
Charlotte Hornets (baseball) players
Memphis Chickasaws players
Newark Bears (IL) players
Birmingham Barons players
Oakland Oaks (baseball) players
Atlanta Crackers players
Kansas City Blues (baseball) players
Scranton Miners players
Indianapolis Indians players
People from Buford, Georgia
Sportspeople from the Atlanta metropolitan area